American Radass (This Is Important) is the first studio album by the American emo band Dads. It was released on August 7, 2012 by Flannel Gurl Records.

Critical reception

American Radass (This Is Important) has received critical acclaim from music critics. At Metacritic, which assigns a normalized rating out of 100 to reviews from mainstream critics, the album received an average score of 83, based on two reviews. Vulture ranked the song "Shit Twins" at No. 95 on their list of the 100 Greatest Emo Songs of All Time.

Track listing

References 

2012 debut albums
Dads (band) albums